Pediasia phrygius is a moth in the family Crambidae. It is found in Turkey.

References

Moths described in 1990
Crambini
Moths of Asia